Sir William Waldegrave (1540 – 25 August 1613) was an English Member of Parliament.

Waldegrave was born into a prosperous and well-connected Suffolk family, the only son of Sir William Waldegrave and Juliana, the daughter of Sir John Raysnford.

He studied at Lincoln's Inn, but was not called to the Bar, instead choosing to rely on his large estates in East Anglia for income. Waldegrave was elected as Member of Parliament for Suffolk in 1563. He was knighted in 1576. He served as Sheriff of Norfolk and Suffolk between 1586 and 1589.

Waldegrave married firstly Elizabeth (d.1581), daughter of Thomas Mildmay and had six sons and four daughters. He married secondly Grizelda, daughter of William Paget, 1st Baron Paget and widow of Sir Thomas Rivett.

References

1540 births
1613 deaths
Waldegrave family
Politicians from Suffolk
English MPs 1563–1567
High Sheriffs of Norfolk
High Sheriffs of Suffolk